

A chang is a kind of Chinese ghost or zombie who lures others to their death. Most often, changs are the spirits of those killed by tigers, enslaved by the beast that killed them and unable to find release until they find a new victim for the tiger, who then takes their place. In some tellings, the chang performs a similar role after drowning. It was described in Tang Peizheng's Song-era Taiping Guangji.

The chang appears in the Chinese idioms "act the chang for the tiger"   "to help evil people") and "wolves can't go without beis and tigers can't bite without changs"   "evil people can't succeed on their own").

References

Citations

Bibliography
 .

Chinese ghosts